Ravi is a village in Tuscany, central Italy, administratively a frazione of the comune of Gavorrano, province of Grosseto. At the time of the 2001 census its population amounted to 263.

Ravi is about 32 km from Grosseto and 2 km from Gavorrano, and it is situated on one of the peaks of Monte Calvo, along the road which links Gavorrano to Caldana.

History 
The village was born as a property of the bishops of Roselle in the 8th century. It was formerly known as Ravi di Maremma.

Main sights 
 Church of San Leonardo (15th century), main parish church of the village, it was restructured in 1810.
 Church of Santa Caterina da Siena (16th century), it was built in 1571 and then transformed into warehouses and garage in 1930.
 Chapel of Nuovo Inguardio, modern chapel in the hamlet of Bivio di Ravi.
 Castle of Ravi, mentioned for the first time in a document of 784, it has been incorporated in the architectures of the old centre.

References

Bibliography 
  Emanuele Repetti, «Ravi», Dizionario Geografico Fisico Storico della Toscana, 1833–1846.
 Bruno Santi, Guida storico-artistica alla Maremma. Itinerari culturali nella provincia di Grosseto, Siena, Nuova Immagine, 1995.
 Giuseppe Guerrini, Torri e castelli della provincia di Grosseto, Siena, Nuova Immagine, 1999.

Frazioni of Gavorrano